Nathan T. Pulsifier (born 1877) was a minor league baseball player and collegiate American football and basketball and coach. He served as the head men's basketball coach at Tufts University from 1908 to 1909. He served as the head football coach at Dean College in 1907 before accepting the same role at Tufts in 1908.

Pulsifer was a graduate of Bates College and later studied at Harvard Medical School in Cambridge, Massachusetts.

References

External links

1877 births
Year of death missing
Baseball first basemen
Baseball second basemen
Baseball shortstops
Basketball coaches from Maine
Concord Marines players
Dean Bulldogs football coaches
Hartford Cooperatives players
Lynn Shoemakers players
Norfolk Skippers players
Portland Phenoms players
Sioux City Packers players
Tufts Jumbos football coaches
Tufts Jumbos men's basketball coaches
Bates College alumni
Harvard Medical School alumni
Sportspeople from Auburn, Maine
Players of American football from Maine